Aeroports de Catalunya is a public company, owned by the Government of Catalonia, and attached to its Ministry of Land and Sustainability. It manages airports, airfields or heliports which form part of the company or of the Catalan government.

It was created in 2008 with the aim of consolidating a model of airport management in Catalonia alternative to the Spanish Government's Aena.

Network 
As of August 2010, Aeroports de Catalunya owned:

Lleida and La Seu d'Urgell airports
La Cerdanya Aerodrome (jointly owned with the local County Council)

References

Airport operators
2008 establishments in Catalonia
Transport companies of Spain
Government-owned companies of Spain